Alexander Springs is an unincorporated community in Lawrence County, Tennessee, in the United States.

Alexander Springs was named for Absalom Alexander, the original owner of the town site.

References

Unincorporated communities in Lawrence County, Tennessee
Unincorporated communities in Tennessee